Miloš Mihajlov (born 15 December 1982) is a Serbian former professional footballer who played as a defender.

Career
Born in Belgrade, Mihajlov started out at Voždovac. He helped the Dragons win the Serbian League Belgrade in the 2003–04 season and gain promotion to the 2004–05 Serbian Second League. Following the club's merger with Železnik, Mihajlov made his debut in the top flight during the 2005–06 campaign.

In June 2006, Mihajlov signed a four-year contract with Partizan. He scored the opening goal in the Belgrade derby on 24 February 2007, heading in Marko Lomić's corner kick, as Partizan won the game 4–2. In January 2008, Mihajlov moved to Turkish club Konyaspor. He subsequently played for Romanian club Politehnica Iași and Chinese club Changchun Yatai.

In 2011, Mihajlov moved to Kazakhstan, staying there for the next two seasons with Zhetysu. He also played for Norwegian club Sandnes Ulf in 2013. In January 2014, Mihajlov returned to Serbia and signed for his former club Voždovac.

In February 2015, Mihajlov rejoined Zhetysu. He spent only six months there, before again returning to Voždovac.

Career statistics

References

External links
 Srbijafudbal profile
 
 
 

1982 births
Living people
Serbia and Montenegro footballers
Serbian expatriate footballers
Serbian footballers
Association football defenders
Changchun Yatai F.C. players
FC Politehnica Iași (1945) players
FC Zhetysu players
FK Partizan players
FK Voždovac players
Konyaspor footballers
Sandnes Ulf players
FK Inđija players
FK Železničar Pančevo players
First League of Serbia and Montenegro players
Kazakhstan Premier League players
Liga I players
Süper Lig players
Eliteserien players
Serbian SuperLiga players
Serbian First League players
Chinese Super League players
Footballers from Belgrade
Expatriate footballers in China
Expatriate footballers in Kazakhstan
Expatriate footballers in Norway
Expatriate footballers in Romania
Expatriate footballers in Turkey
Serbian expatriate sportspeople in China
Serbian expatriate sportspeople in Kazakhstan
Serbian expatriate sportspeople in Norway
Serbian expatriate sportspeople in Romania
Serbian expatriate sportspeople in Turkey